Rabeh Ahmed T. Al-Hussaini (born August 11, 1988) is a Filipino professional basketball player who last played for the Blackwater Elite of the PBA. A power forward/center, he played five seasons for the Ateneo de Manila Blue Eagles in the University Athletic Association of the Philippines from 2005 to 2009 and led the Eagles to back-to-back basketball championships in his last two seasons with them. He averaged 24.6 point per game, 13 rebounds per game, and 2 assists per game.

Professional career

Philippine Basketball Association
Al-Hussaini entered the 2010 PBA draft, and was selected as the second overall pick by the Air21 Express. It was expected that either he or Nonoy Baclao, his Ateneo teammate, were to go Number 1 in the draft. Baclao was eventually drafted first overall by the Express.

On October 8, 2010, Al-Hussaini made his PBA debut with 16 points, 11 rebounds, and 1 assist in a loss to the San Miguel Beermen.

Kuwaiti Division I Basketball League
He signed with Kuwaiti Division I Basketball League team Al Qadsia.

PBA career statistics

Correct as of October 19, 2016

Season-by-season averages

|-
| align=left | 
| align=left | Air21 / Petron
| 37 || 28.4 || .418 || .000 || .670 || 6.9 || 1.1 || .1 || .6 || 14.2
|-
| align=left | 
| align=left | Petron / Powerade
| 13 || 16.5 || .393 || .000 || .667 || 2.9 || .5 || .1 || .2 || 5.9
|-
| align=left | 
| align=left | GlobalPort / Talk 'N Text
| 42 || 17.0 || .401 || .000 || .644 || 3.8 || .8 || .1 || .2 || 6.8
|-
| align=left | 
| align=left | Meralco
| 23 || 16.7 || .341 || .000 || .651 || 5.0 || .7 || .0 || .4 || 5.0
|-
| align=left | 
| align=left | Meralco
| 23 || 12.4 || .487 || .000 || .542 || 2.2 || .4 || .1 || .4 || 5.4
|-class=sortbottom
| align=center colspan=2 | Career
| 138 || 19.2 || .410 || .000 || .652 || 4.5 || .8 || .1 || .4 || 8.2

References

1988 births
Living people
Ateneo Blue Eagles men's basketball players
Barako Bull Energy draft picks
Barako Bull Energy players
Basketball players from Metro Manila
Blackwater Bossing players
Centers (basketball)
Filipino men's basketball players
Filipino people of Kuwaiti descent
Meralco Bolts players
NLEX Road Warriors players
NorthPort Batang Pier players
People from Makati
Philippine Basketball Association All-Stars
Power forwards (basketball)
San Miguel Beermen players
TNT Tropang Giga players